The 2022 UCI Track Champions League was the second edition of the UCI Track Champions League, a track cycling competition held over four rounds in November and December 2022.

Titles were awarded in two categories – Endurance and Sprint – for women and men; the women's titles were won by Mathilde Gros (Sprint) and Jennifer Valente (Endurance), while the men's titles were won by Matthew Richardson (Sprint) and Claudio Imhof (Endurance).

Points standings

Scoring system
Points were awarded to the top fifteen riders, with twenty points being awarded to each race winner. In the case of a tie on points, a countback system was used where the highest most recent race result determined the final positions. The leader of each classification was denoted by a light blue jersey.

Men

Sprint

Endurance

Women

Sprint

Endurance

References

External links

Champions League
UCI
UCI
UCI
UCI
UCI
UCI
UCI
UCI
UCI
International cycle races hosted by Germany
International cycle races hosted by Spain
International cycle races hosted by France
International cycle races hosted by the United Kingdom
UCI Track Champions League